Belair is an unincorporated community in Lancaster County, in the U.S. state of South Carolina.

History
A post office called Belair was established in 1813, and remained in operation until 1902. According to tradition, the community was named for a bell which hung prominently before a local tavern. A variant name is "Bel Air".

References

Unincorporated communities in South Carolina
Unincorporated communities in Lancaster County, South Carolina